Acraea simulata is a butterfly in the family Nymphalidae. It is found in Uganda, where it seems to be endemic to the Ssese Islands in Lake Victoria.

Taxonomy
It is a member of the Acraea masamba  species group   -   but see also Pierre & Bernaud, 2014

References

Butterflies described in 1923
simulata
Endemic fauna of Uganda
Butterflies of Africa